Midvale may refer to:


Places 
Midvale, Western Australia
Midvale Ridge, an area of south central England

United States 
Midvale, Idaho
Midvale, Montana
Midvale, Ohio
Midvale, Utah, the largest city with the name in the United States
Midvale, Washington
Midvale, West Virginia

Other uses 
 Midvale (DC Comics), the home of Supergirl
 "Midvale" (Supergirl), an episode of the television series Supergirl
 Midvale Steel

See also